The Pangkor Treaty of 1874 was a treaty signed between Great Britain and the Sultan of Perak on 20 January 1874, on the Colonial Steamer Pluto, off the coast of Perak. The treaty is significant in the history of the Malay states as it legitimised British control of the Malay rulers and paved the way for British imperialism in Malaya. It was the result of a multi-day conference organised by Andrew Clarke, the Governor of the Straits Settlements, to solve two problems: the Larut War, and Sultanship in Perak.

Precedence 

Perak was a major tin producer throughout the 19th century, leading Britain, which had already colonised Penang, Malacca and Singapore, to consider Perak of significant importance. However, local strife, collectively known as the Larut Wars (1861–1874), between the local Malay elites and frequent clashes between Chinese secret societies disrupted the supply of tin from the mines of Perak.

In 1871, Sultan Ali of Perak died. However, Raja Abdullah, the heir apparent, had not been present at his funeral. Raja Bendahara Sultan Ismail was proclaimed Sultan of Perak instead. At the same time, two Chinese secret societies, Ghee Hin (led by Chin Ah Yam) and Hai San (led by Chung Keng Quee), constantly waged battle against each other over control of the tin mines.

Raja Muda Abdullah later appealed to the British regarding these two problems. He turned to Tan Kim Cheng, his friend in Singapore who was a well-known businessman. Tan, together with an English merchant in Singapore, drafted a letter to Governor Sir Andrew Clarke which Abdullah signed. The letter expressed  Abdullah's desire to place Perak under British protection, and "to have a man of sufficient abilities to show (him) a good system of government." On 26 September 1872, Chung Keng Quee had already presented a petition, signed by himself and 44 other Chinese leaders, seeking British interference following the attack of 12,000 men of Chung Shan by 2,000 men of Sen Ning. The British immediately saw this as an opportunity to expand its influence in Southeast Asia and to strengthen its monopoly on tin exports. As a result, the Pangkor Treaty of 1874 was signed.

The Malay translation of the treaty was prepared by Frank Swettenham and Mohamed Said, the munshi for the Straits Settlements.

Summary of the conference 

The Chinese chiefs arrived on January 13 (Tuesday), the Hai San group was accompanied by Swettenham, while the Ghee Hins group was escorted by Pickering. Mantri Ngah Ibrahim arrived the next day (January 14), escorted by his lawyer R. C. Woods and his security chief T. C. Speedy. Raja Muda Abdullah and the Malay chiefs arrived on January 15. The afternoon session (circa 3:30 pm) of January 16 (Friday) was a one-to-one meeting between Mantri Ngah Ibrahim and Clarke, in which Clarke highlighted to the Mantri that the problem in Larut is a direct consequence of his vacillating policy. The second day of the conference (January 17) was the meeting between Clarke and the Malay chiefs, whose opinions were individually considered before the candidate for the Sultanship was decided. January 18 was a Saturday and no business was conducted. On January 19, the draft treaty was discussed with the Malay chiefs. The Treaty of Pangkor was officially sealed in the afternoon session of the concluding day. (Actually in the morning session of January 20, another agreement between Clarke and the Chinese chiefs was signed, i.e. Bond of $50,000 to Keep the Peace).

Agreement

Terms and conditions 

The agreement dictated:

 That the Raja Muda Abdullah be recognised as the Sultan of Perak.
 That the Raja Bandahara Ismail, now Acting Sultan, be allowed to retain the title of Sultan Muda with a pension and a certain small territory assigned to him.
 That all the other nominations of great Officers made at the time the Rajah Bandahara Ismail received the regalia be confirmed.
 That the power given to the Orang Kayah Mantri over Larut by the late Sultan be confirmed.
 That all revenues be collected and all appointments made in the name of the Sultan.
 That the Sultan receive and provide a suitable residence for a British Officer to be called Resident, who shall be accredited to his Court, and whose advice must be asked and acted upon on all questions other than those touching Malay religion and custom.
 That the Governor of Larut shall have attached to him as Assistant Resident, a British Officer acting under the Resident of Perak, with similar power and subordinate only to the said Resident.
 That the cost of these Residents with their establishments be determined by the Government of the Straits Settlements and be a first charge on the Revenues of Perak.
 That a Civil List regulating the income to be received by the Sultan, by the Bandahara, by the Mantri, and by the other Officers be the next charge on the said Revenue.
 That the collection and control of all Revenues and the general administration of the country be regulated under the advice of these Residents.
 That the Treaty under which the Pulo Dinding and the islands of Pangkor were ceded to Great Britain having been misunderstood and it being desirable to readjust the same, so as to carry into effect the intention of the Framers thereof, it is hereby declared that the Boundaries of the said Territory so ceded shall be rectified as follows, that is to say:-  From Bukit Sigari, as laid down in the Chart Sheet No. 1 Straits of Malacca, a tracing of which is annexed, marked A, in a straight line to the sea, thence along the sea coast to the South, to Pulo Katta on the West, and from Pulo Katta a line running North East about five miles, and thence North to Bukit Sigari.
 That the Southern watershed of the Krean River, that is to say, the portion of land draining into that River from the South be declared British Territory, as a rectification of the Southern Boundary of Province Wellesley. Such Boundary to be marked out by Commissioners; one named by the Government of the Straits Settlements, and the other by the Sultan of Perak.
 That on the cessation of the present disturbances in Perak and the re-establishment of peace and amity among the contending factions in that country, immediate measures under the control and supervision of one or more British Officers shall be taken for restoring as far as practicable the occupation of the mines, and the possession of machinery, &c., as held previous to the commencement of these disturbances, and for the payment of compensation for damages, the decision of such officers shall be final in such case.
 The Mantri of Larut engages to acknowledge as a debt due by him to the Government of the Straits Settlements, the charges and expenses incurred by this investigation, as well as charges and expenses to which the Colony of the Straits Settlements and Great Britain have been put or may be put by their efforts to secure the tranquility of Perak and the safety of trade.

Result 
Raja Ismail did not attend the meeting arranged between Sir Andrew Clarke and Raja Abdullah. Raja Ismail obviously did not recognise the agreement but had no choice as he was faced with the alliance between Raja Abdullah and the British. As a result, Raja Abdullah was made Sultan, and Sir James W.W. Birch was appointed as Perak's first British Resident after the treaty came into force.

Following this precedent, the British actively became involved in three other Malay states: Negeri Sembilan, Selangor and Pahang. These states, along with Perak, were later reorganised into the Federated Malay States.

See also

References

Further reading
 Kim, Khoo Kay, and Andrew Clarke, "The Pangkor Engagement of 1874". Journal of the Malaysian Branch of the Royal Asiatic Society 47.1 (225) (1974): 1–12 online.
1874 treaties
History of Perak
British Malaya
Treaties of the United Kingdom (1801–1922)
1874 in British Malaya
1874 in the British Empire
1874 in Southeast Asia